The 2000–01 Fussball Club Basel 1893 season was their 107th season since the club's foundation on 15 November 1893. Following their promotion in the 1993–94 season this was their seventh consecutive season in the highest tier of Swiss football.
René C. Jäggi was the club's chairman for the fifth year. FC Basel played their home games in the alternate Stadion Schützenmatte while the new stadium was being built and as of 15 March 2001 in the brand new St. Jakob-Park.

Overview 
Christian Gross was the first team trainer for the second season. Still forming his team, Basel made a number of signings before the season started. Goalkeeper Miroslav König, André Muff and Hakan Yakin signed in from Grasshopper Club. The two strikers Hervé Tum, from Sion, and Jean-Michel Tchouga, from Yverdon-Sports, joined to strengthen the attack. Ivan Ergic joined from Juventus and Carlos Varela was loaned from Servette.

In the other direction Luís Calapes moved to Xamax, Didier Tholot and Thomas Häberli to Young Boys and Agent Sawu to Wil. Also Pascal Zuberbühler went on a one-year loan to Bayer Leverkusen, Marco Tschopp on a one-year loan to Xamax and Edmond N'Tiamoah on a six-month loan to SR Delémont.

The Campaign

Friendly games 
Basel entered the Sempione Cup, which was played in Balsthal. The first match against Brasilian team Ituano FC was won and the second match against Turkish team Besiktas Istanbul ended in a draw. Basel were placed second in the final classification.

Domestic League 
The Qualification Round to the League season 2000–01 was contested by twelve teams. The first eight teams of the regular season (or Qualification) then competed in the Championship Playoff Round. The regular season started on 15 July and ended on 10 December. The championship play-offs began on 25 February 2001 and ended on 26 May. The teams aim was to end the qualification round in the top four table and in the championship to reach the 2001–02 UEFA Cup. Basel started the regular season with three wins and three defeats, but then became somewhat more consistent, being defeated just once in the following 12 matches. The end of the first half of the regular season ended very disappointing as the team lost four of the last five games and slipped to fifth position in the league table.

Basel were able to play the games of the Championship Group in the new stadium, the St. Jakob-Park opened on 15 March 2001. It was sold out with 33,433 spectators on three occasions, Lausanne-Sport (15.03.2001), St. Gallen (14.04.2001) and Grasshopper Club (15.05.2001) The team were more consistent in the championship, they were only beaten twice. But they only won four matches (eight draws), goal scoring was very rare. Basel ended the season in fourth position in the league table, thus qualifying for the 2001 UEFA Intertoto Cup.

Domestic Cup 
The Swiss Cup started for Basel in the Round of 32 on 18 February 2001. Basel defeated lower class Etoile Carouge, but only after a penalty shoot out. In the next round they were drawn against and beat lower classed Bellinzona, but only narrowly. In the quarterfinals Basel were defeated by Lausanne-Sport, again after another penalty shoot out.

Europe 
Basel were qualified for the UEFA Cup and in the qualifying round they beat Folgore 12-1 on aggregate. In the first round they beat Brann Bergen with an aggregate score of 7–6. In the second round Basel were tied against Feyenoord. Feyenoord won both matches and so the European season came to an end for Basel before Christmas.

Players

First team squad 
The following is the list of the Basel first team squad. It includes all players that were in the squad the day the season started on 15 July 2000 but subsequently left the club after that date and it includes all players that transferred in during the season.

Transfers in

Transfers out

Results 
Legend

Friendly matches

Pre- and mid-season

Winter break and mid-season

Nationalliga A

Qualifying Phase

League table

Champions Group

League table

Swiss Cup

UEFA Cup

Qualifying round 

Basel win 12-1 on aggregate

First round 

Basel won 7–6 on aggregate.

Second round 

Feyenoord win 3–1 on aggregate

References

Sources
 Rotblau: Jahrbuch Saison 2015/2016. Publisher: FC Basel Marketing AG. 
 Die ersten 125 Jahre / 2018. Publisher: Josef Zindel im Friedrich Reinhardt Verlag, Basel. 
 2000–01 at "Basler Fussballarchiv” homepage
 2000–01 at Joggeli.ch
 2000–01 at RSSSF

External links
 FC Basel official site

FC Basel seasons
Basel